Grasp of the Emerald Claw is an adventure module for the 3.5 edition of the Dungeons & Dragons fantasy role-playing game.

Plot summary
Grasp of the Emerald Claw takes place in the Eberron setting. The player characters must find a relic of great power deep in the jungles of Xen'drik before the agents of the Order of the Emerald Claw locate it.

Publication history
Grasp of the Emerald Claw was written by Bruce R. Cordell, and was published in January 2005. Cover art was by Wayne Reynolds, with interior art by Steve Prescott.

Reception

External links
product info

References

Eberron adventures
Role-playing game supplements introduced in 2005